Sophia Sampaio Abrahão (born May 22, 1991) is a Brazilian actress and singer.

Abrahão starred in her first telenovela in 2007, when she played the preppy Felipa on the 15th season of Malhação. In 2011, she played the preppy Alice Albuquerque on the telenovela Rebelde, which led to the band Rebeldes, which participated along with the other five protagonists of the telenovela.

In 2013, Abrahão was invited to play Tina in the film Confissões de Adolescente, repeating the role she had done in the play in 2010. She then played Natasha on the telenovela Amor à Vida, where she dyed her hair to play a redhead for the characterization of the character of the sister of Nicole (Marina Ruy Barbosa). In 2014, Sophia played Gaby in the telenovela Alto Astral.

In February 2015, Abrahão became one of four digital spokespeople for L'Oreal Paris Brazil. In October of the same year, she released her self-titled album Sophia Abrahão.

Career
Sophia Abrahão began modeling at 14 years-of-age. When she was 15 years old, she lived alone in China for four months. Later, she traveled to countries like Japan, Singapore and Hong Kong, where she worked making catalogs and fashion shows.She converted to buddhism. When she returned to Brazil, she continued her modeling career and in parallel, joined a theater course, when the test for the telenovela Malhação emerged. Sophia was approved for the 2007 season, in which she played the preppy Felipa.

In 2010, the actress participated in the television series Bicicleta e Melancia via Multishow. In the theater, she participated in Confissões de Adolescente, also during that year. A few months later, she signed a contract with Rede Record to be one of the protagonists of the teen telenovela Rebelde, playing the preppy Alice Albuquerque. Alice is one of the six vocalists of the band Rebeldes, which has performed in cities throughout Brazil.

In 2012, after the end of Rebelde, Abrahão launched her personal blog, which features fashion productions, beauty tips, and updates. Already preparing to follow up with her solo career in music, Abrahão did some songs with her cousin Brian Cohen and released two video clips between 2012 and 2013 which are entitled "Sem Você" and "Não Quero Mais". She also continued doing shows for the farewell tour of Rebeldes which had its last show on May 4, 2013, in the capital of Minas Gerais, Belo Horizonte. Afterward, Abrahão was selected to be one of the protagonists of the film Confissões de Adolescente, reprising the character "Tina".

In 2013 she dyed her hair red to play the role of Natasha, the sister of Nicole (Marina Ruy Barbosa) in the telenovela Amor à Vida. She did part of the plan of Lídia (Angela Rebello) and Rogério (Daniel Rocha), which began to be put in place after the girl back to the doctor in the United States, to get back at Leila (Fernanda Machado) and Thales (Ricardo Tozzi) for what they did to her sister.

In 2014 she played the righteous Gaby in the telenovela Alto Astral. After the end of the telenovela, Sophia Abrahão was cast in the feature-length film Se a Vida Começasse Agora, directed by Alexandre Klemperer.

2015-present: First studio album
In October 2015 she released her first studio album, self-titled "Sophia Abrahão". The album contains compositions of Fernando Zor (who also produced the album) and even a cover of the song "Resposta" (by rock band Skank). Abrahão launched in September 2015 the song "Náufrago," the lead single from the album "Sophia Abrahão". They were already plans to shoot the music video for "Pelúcia," due to be released in April 2016.

Filmography
Below is Sophia Abrahão's filmography:

Telenovelas

TV Series

Films

Discography

 Sophia Abrahão (2015)

Literature
 O Reino Das Vozes Que Não Se Calam (with Carolina Munhóz) (2014)
If you find a place where everyone would accept... I would be able to abandon it? Sophie hides from everyone and herself, insecure, she can not see her beauty and talent, and has difficulty in relating with others. Their daily life is lost among the crooked ways of living with depression and bullying, and the girl is slowly closing in the darkness of his thoughts. Helpless and without courage to deal with their problems, you discover a magical place: a Kingdom where the voices are not silent and enchanted creatures become real. A colorful place where she can finally meet. Torn between reality and fantasy, Sophie will have the invaluable help of an ordinary man and an enchanted guardian, that will show the secrets of the soul and the will to decide whether it is worth facing your fears or live in an eternal fairy tale..

 O Mundo Das Vozes Silenciadas (with Carolina Munhóz) (2015)
Years after leaving the Kingdom of the voices that are not silent to back, Sophie began working as an assistant to a famous rock band. While trying to cope with the challenges of his new life, the young woman did not realize that soon will be called back to his magical world. And much less how much his long absence was detrimental to the Kingdom. Do you need to decide again between reality and fantasy? "O Mundo Das vozes silenciadas" is the new book by Carolina Munhóz and Sophia Abrahão and the anticipated sequel to "O Reino das Vozes que não se Calam", which sold over 30,000 copies and figured in the ranking of bestsellers of domestic fiction 2014 of Nielsen. A contemporary fairy tale signed by a lead author of the national fantasy literature in partnership with one of the most celebrated new generation of actresses. Simultaneously with the launch of the novel, will be released "O Reino Secreto" - Coloring Book, forming a fantastic world created by the authors with Felipe Carvalho illustrations..

 O Reino Secreto (with Carolina Munhóz) (2015)
Simultaneously with the launch of "O Mundo das vozes silenciadas", the second volume of Carolina Munhóz and Sophia Abrahão trilogy started in "O Reino Das Vozes que não Se calam", The Editora Rocco launches "O Reino Secreto" - Coloring Book, forming fantastic world created by authors with Felipe Carvalho illustrations. Contemporary fairytale signed by a lead author of the national fantasy literature in partnership with one of the most celebrated new generation of actresses, the story of the young Sophie, who won a period of sadness and difficulties with the help of mystical beings of a kingdom enchanted, comes alive in this coloring book which is a real journey through a magical world.

Concert tours
 2016–present: Tudo Que Eu Sempre Quis Tour

Awards and nominations

Actress
 2011: Melhor Atriz at the Meus Prêmios Nick, for Rebelde (won)
 2011: Melhor Atriz Nacional at the Capricho Awards, for Rebelde (nominated)
 2012: Melhor Atriz de Novela at the Prêmio Contigo! de TV, for Rebelde (nominated)
 2012: Personagem de TV Favorito at the Meus Prêmios Nick, for Rebelde (nominated)
 2012: Melhor Atriz Nacional at the Capricho Awards, for Rebelde (won)
 2014: Actress at the Shorty Awards, for Amor à Vida (nominated)
 2014: Atriz Favorita at the Revista Atrevida, for Alto Astral (nominated)
 2015: Melhor Atriz de 2014 at the Troféu Internet, for Alto Astral (nominated)
 2015: Melhor Atriz Jovem at the Prêmio Jovem Brasileiro, for Alto Astral (nominated)

Singer
 2014: Experimente at the Prêmio Multishow de Música Brasileira (nominated)
 2014: Cantora Favorita at the Meus Prêmios Nick (nominated)
 2014: Melhor Cantora Jovem at the Prêmio Jovem Brasileiro (won)
 2015: Melhor Cantora Jovem at the Prêmio Jovem Brasileiro (nominated)
 2015: Cantora Nacional at the Capricho Awards (nominated)
 2015: Cantora Nacional do Ano at the Prêmio Top TodaTeen (nominated)
 2015: Cantora Nacional at the Geração Z Awards (won)
 2016: Melhor Cantora at the Prêmio Multishow de Música Brasileira (nominated)
 2016: Best New Artist at the Latin Grammy Award (nominated)
 2016: Cantora Nacional at the Capricho Awards (nominated)

Others
 2012: Melhor Instagram (@sophiaabrahao) at the Capricho Awards (won)
 2012: Mais Estilosa at the Capricho Awards (won)
 2013: Celebrity Fashion at the Shorty Awards (won)
 2013: Casal Real at the Capricho Awards (with Fiuk) (nominated)
 2013: Melhor Capa da Capricho at the Capricho Awards (won)
 2013: Melhor Blog at the Capricho Awards (won)
 2013: Fã-Clube do Ano at the Capricho Awards (nominated)
 2013: Melhor Blog Jovem at the Prêmio Jovem Brasileiro (won)
 2013: Tuiteira Favorita (@sophiaabrahao) at the Meus Prêmios Nick (won)
 2014: Celebridade de 2013 at the Celebridade E! Online (won)
 2014: Brazil, Instagrammer, Fashion, Blogger at the Shorty Awards (nominated)
 2014: Capa da Atrê do ano at the Revista Atrevida (nominated)
 2014: Término do ano at the Revista Atrevida (with Fiuk) (nominated)
 2014: Fandom do ano at the Revista Atrevida (nominated)
 2014: Melhor Look de 2014 at the website EGO Globo (won)
 2014: Atriz mais bem-vestida do ano de 2014 at the Revista Glamour (won)
 2015: Melhor Look no Baile da Vogue 2015 at the website EGO Globo (won)
 2015: PopQUEM at the Revista QUEM (won)
 2015: Brazil at the Shorty Awards (won)
 2015: Melhor Look no Prêmio Contigo! de TV at the website EGO Globo (won)
 2015: Site ou blog preferido at the Prêmio Jovem Brasileiro (won)
 2015: Personalidade jovem do twitter (@sophiaabrahao) at the Prêmio Jovem Brasileiro (won)
 2015: Melhor instagram de todos os tempos (@sophiaabrahao) at the Prêmio Jovem Brasileiro (won)
 2015: Jovem do ano at the Prêmio Jovem Brasileiro (nominated)
 2015: Melhor Casal Real de 2015 at the Capricho Awards (with Sergio Malheiros) (nominated)
 2015: Mais Estilosa at the Capricho Awards (nominated)
 2015: It girl do ano at the Prêmio Top TodaTeen (nominated)
 2016: Jovem do Ano at the Prêmio Jovem Brasileiro (won)
 2016: Melhor Instagram at the Prêmio Jovem Brasileiro (won)
 2016: Mais Estilosa at the Capricho Awards (pending)

References

External links

 
 
 
 

1991 births
Living people
Actresses from São Paulo
Brazilian Buddhists
Converts to Buddhism
Brazilian telenovela actresses
Brazilian stage actresses
21st-century Brazilian singers
21st-century Brazilian women singers
Shorty Award winners
Women in Latin music